Cassa di Risparmio di Vercelli was an Italian retail bank and charity organization, based in Vercelli, Piedmont. In 1991 it was split into Cassa di Risparmio di Vercelli S.p.A. and Fondazione Cassa di Risparmio di Vercelli. The former was merged with another Piedmontese bank Cassa di Risparmio di Biella in 1994.

Bank
Cassa di Risparmio della Città e Provincia di Vercelli was formed by the royal decree on 19 August 1851. Due to Legge Amato, it was split into Cassa di Risparmio di Vercelli S.p.A. and Fondazione Cassa di Risparmio di Vercelli on 23 December 1991 (gazetted on 24 January 1992). In late 1994, the company was merged with Cassa di Risparmio di Biella, in a ratio of 26.2% (Vercelli) and 73.8% (Biella).

Banking foundation
Fondazione Cassa di Risparmio di Vercelli was the owner of all of the share capital of the bank in 1992, for 35 billion lire par value. However, after the merger with C.R. Biella, the foundation only owned 26.2% of 235 billion lire share capital of Cassa di Risparmio di Biella e Vercelli (BiverBanca). The foundation further reduced the ownership as their investment in 1997 by selling around 14.4% shares of the bank to Banca Commerciale Italiana. After 2008 recapitalization of the bank, the foundation further reduced to own about 6% shares of the bank only.

As of 31 December 2014, the foundation had a minority ownership in Cassa Depositi e Prestiti, CDP Reti and BiverBanca. It had a shareholders' equity of €114,600,761.

See also
other bank of the provincial capital of Piedmont
 Cassa di Risparmio di Asti
 Cassa di Risparmio di Alessandria, now part of Banca Popolare di Milano
 Cassa di Risparmio di Cuneo, now part of UBI Banca
 Cassa di Risparmio di Torino, now part of UniCredit

References

External links
 Fondazione Cassa di Risparmio di Vercelli 

Banks established in 1851
1851 establishments in the Kingdom of Sardinia
Banks disestablished in 1994
Italian companies disestablished in 1994
Defunct banks of Italy
Companies based in Piedmont
Vercelli
Italian companies established in 1851